Microbacterium marinilacus is a Gram-positive bacterium from the genus Microbacterium which has been isolated from the Sano Marine Lake in the Republic of Palau.

References

Further reading

External links
Type strain of Microbacterium marinilacus at BacDive -  the Bacterial Diversity Metadatabase	

Bacteria described in 2007
marinilacus